San Pablo La Laguna is a municipality in the Sololá department of Guatemala. It consists of the village that bears the name San Pablo La Laguna which is situated on the shore of Lake Atitlan between the villages of San Juan La Laguna and San Marcos La Laguna.

Municipalities of the Sololá Department